Ivaylo Zafirov (born 16 April 1992) is a Bulgarian football player, currently playing for Kaliakra Kavarna as a forward.

Zafirov's father Adalbert Zafirov is a former football player and current manager of Kaliakra.

Career
Zafirov began his career with Bulgarian powerhouse CSKA Sofia. He made his debut for the CSKA first team on the last day of the 2009–10 campaign on 16 May 2010 in a 0–2 away loss against Chernomorets Burgas, coming on as a substitute for Kristiyan Velinov. The following season, Zafirov played for the club's Under-19 side.

In July 2011 he joined Kaliakra Kavarna. In 2012, he retired from football.

References

Living people
1992 births
Bulgarian footballers
Association football forwards
PFC CSKA Sofia players
PFC Kaliakra Kavarna players
First Professional Football League (Bulgaria) players